Signy Fardal (born 29 August 1961) is a Norwegian magazine editor.

Since 1998 she is the editor-in-chief of the Norwegian version of Elle. She graduated from the University of Oslo in 1984, worked as a journalist for Dagbladet from 1984 to 1986 and for Dagens Næringsliv from 1986 to 1998. She also manages the company that publishes Elle in Norway.

References

1961 births
Living people
Norwegian magazine editors
University of Oslo alumni
Women magazine editors
Dagbladet people